Kirkop United Football Club is a Maltese football club based in Ħal Kirkop, Malta. The club currently plays in the Maltese National Amateur League B.  They also play in the annual Maltese FA Trophy.

References

Football clubs in Malta
1956 establishments in Malta
Kirkop
Association football clubs established in 1956